Linton is a settlement and civil parish in South Derbyshire, England, 5 miles south east of Burton-on-Trent. The population of the civil parish taken at the 2011 Census was 2,303.

Nearby settlements are the town of Swadlincote and the villages of Castle Gresley, Overseal, Rosliston, Cauldwell (pronounced "Cordal") and Botany Bay. Many former fields to the south of the village are now wooded areas, forming part of the National Forest.

Linton village  consists of a primary school, a convenience store with a post office, one pub, two churches, a village hall, a community room called The Brick Room and Rickman's Corner Community Hall. The Brick Room belongs to Linton Church; it may have been a schoolroom years ago. The highlight of the year used to be the Sale of Work (a craft fair) held in late November of early December, and the Harvest Supper.

The bus services locally to Swadlincote and Burton-on-Trent are provided by Arriva Midlands and Midland Classic. Linton Primary School is on Main Street towards Linton Heath.

History
Linton is mentioned briefly in the Domesday book. The book says  under the title of "The lands of Henry de Ferrers":

"In Linton Leofric had two  carucates of land to the geld. There is land for 12 oxen. It is waste. Scrubland one furlong long and a half broad. TRE it was worth 20 shillings.“

See also
Listed buildings in Linton, Derbyshire

References

External links

 Linton Parish Council
 Genuki
 Oral history of life in Linton

Villages in Derbyshire
Civil parishes in Derbyshire
South Derbyshire District